Bobby Vinton Sings the Newest Hits is Bobby Vinton's fifteenth studio album, released in 1967.

Primarily a cover album, this album contains various songs from past years, especially movie themes. Cover songs include "Call Me" (a British hit for Petula Clark in 1964 and U.S. hit for Chris Montez in 1965) and "The End of the World" (a hit for Skeeter Davis in 1963). Movie themes include "Born Free", "The Shadow of Your Smile", "This Is My Song", "Georgy Girl" and "All".  Two singles came from this album: "Coming Home Soldier" (co-written by Vinton); the song, a sequel of sorts to Vinton's earlier hit "Mr. Lonely", reached #11 on the Billboard Hot 100 chart.  The follow-up, "For He's A Jolly Good Fellow", originally written and recorded by Ray Stevens, charted at #66.

Track listing

Personnel
Bobby Vinton - vocals
Robert Mersey - producer, arranger, conductor

Charts
Singles - Billboard (North America)

References

1967 albums
Bobby Vinton albums
Epic Records albums
Covers albums